Celia Roth Cooney (1904 – July 13, 1992) was an American who went on a robbing spree in the spring of 1924. Cooney robbed 10 buildings with her husband Ed Cooney before she was caught. She became known as the Bobbed Haired Bandit for her exploits. The robberies received significant media coverage, making headlines in The New York Times, the Washington Post, Chicago Tribune, San Francisco Chronicle, the Los Angeles Times, and others. The newspapers criticized commissioner Richard Enright and the New York City Police Department for their inability to catch Cooney. In response, Enright ordered the largest manhunt in the city's history, and still failed to catch Cooney.

Cooney evaded capture for 65 days, eventually fleeing to Florida after a botched robbery of the payroll office of the National Biscuit Company. While in Florida, she gave birth to a child, who died several days later. She was caught in April 1924, and sentenced to twenty years in prison, of which she served seven. After leaving prison, she spent the rest of her life in relative obscurity, dying in 1992.

Early life
Celia Cooney was born in 1904. She ran away from her home in 1920. In 1922, she met Ed Cooney, with whom she fell in love. The couple married on May 18, 1923. Celia Cooney worked at the Ostrander Company, and Ed Cooney as a mechanic. After their marriage, Celia became pregnant.

Robberies

Her first robbery took place on January 5, 1924, when Cooney entered a Thomas Ralston grocery in Park Slope, and asked for a dozen eggs. She subsequently held up the store, and stole a total of 680 dollars. The robbery received a smattering of coverage in the Brooklyn Eagle and Brooklyn Citizen. Celia and Ed Cooney soon moved to 1099 Pacific Street. They spent the money quickly, and subsequently robbed an Atlantic and Pacific at 451 Ralph Avenue, and a H. C. Bohack store. In total, they netted about $365 from the two robberies. The New York Daily News and Telegram and Evening Mail covered the robberies, with the Mail coining the nickname "bobbed hair bandit".

The robberies began to attract media attention, with newspapers ridiculing Richard Enright for his incapability to catch the bandit. On January 14, Enright announced that he had caught the bandit. He claimed that it was Helen Quigley, a twenty-three year old actress. Cooney subsequently left a message at a drugstore on Dekalb Avenue. "You dirty fish-peddling bums, leave this innocent girl alone and get the right ones, which is nobody else but us ... We defy you fellows to catch us." Another robbery occurred on Union Street on January 20. The various robberies were covered on front pages in the Daily News, Brooklyn Standard Union, Eagle, Citizen, New York Post, New York Journal-American, The New York Times, and others. At least one poem was written about the robberies.

Enright continued to be heavily criticized for his inability to catch Cooney, as they robbed more stores. As the robberies continued, Enright stepped up his efforts to catch Cooney, naming Mary Cody and Rose Moore as suspects. F. Scott Fitzgerald would later claim that his wife Zelda Fitzgerald had been accused of being the Bobbed Haired Bandit, being stopped on Queensboro Bridge in Queens. The newspapers continued to cover the chase, with the New York Herald and others comparing Cooney to a modern-day Robin Hood. Enright soon assembled 850 detectives, and made catching Cooney their top priority, giving the detectives permission to shoot on sight. Despite having an additional 200 policemen on patrol, Cooney still evaded capture.

Enright eventually established a group of eight detectives known as the "bobbed-hair squad." that consisted of William Casey, Frank Gray, Joseph McCarthy, Joseph Owens, Peter Mathers, and Charles Motjenacker, tasked sole with catching Cooney. On March 5, he ordered half of his reserve police force in Brooklyn to aid the detectives in stopping Cooney. That same night, she robbed another drugstore, and again evaded capture. With the search intensifying, the Cooneys laid low for much of the rest of March, even as the news began covering the topic further.

The robberies that the couple were pulling off, while drawing much attention, were often only bringing in just barely enough to survive on. In order to secure their financial well-being, the couple planned to rob the payroll office of the National Biscuit Company warehouse. The robbery occurred on April 1, 1924. They held up the cashier, Nathan Mazo and several employees. Mazo attempted to stop the robbery, and Ed Cooney subsequently shot him, as he believed that Celia had been hurt. The couple fled, leaving $8,000 behind in the open safe.

The Cooneys fled New York on a Clyde Line steamer, and travelled to Florida. In New York City, the failed robbery set off a large manhunt, where the police failed to find them. On April 3, they arrived in Jacksonville, Florida. Cooney's baby was born on April 10, and within two days it died. On April 15, the police disclosed the identity of Celia and Ed Cooney to the public, and several days later the couple was caught.

Capture and trial 

The capture of the 'Bobbed Hair Bandit' made the front page of many New York City newspapers, as well as the Washington Post, Chicago Tribune, San Francisco Chronicle, and the Los Angeles Times. As she was brought up to New York City for her trial, thousands of people turned out to see her as her train passed. When she arrived in New York City, a large crowd greeted her. The New York World described the crowd: "Neither Presidents nor Jack Dempsey had attracted such a throng to Pennsylvania station as Celia Cooney, Brooklyn's Bobbed Haired Bandit and her husband, Edward did when they reached this city at 3:30." She was tried in Jefferson Market Courthouse, and sentenced to twenty years in prison. She spent her time in Auburn Prison.

Later life
Ed Cooney had his fingers smashed in a machine while in prison, and had his arm eventually amputated below the elbow. Weakened, he developed tuberculosis and died in 1936. Before his death, in 1931, Ed filed a $100,000 case against New York state because of the loss of his arm. His lawyers, Samuel S. Leibowitz, and Jacob Shientag won the case, granting a settlement of $12,000 to the family. The couple were released on October 16, 1931. Celia Cooney spent the rest of her life in relative obscurity, working as a typist, and later at Sperry Gyroscope. She married Harold La Grange in 1943, and died on July 13, 1992. Cooney's exploits would soon enter popular culture, with lectures, plays, and songs featuring her story. In December 2021, true crime comedy podcast My Favorite Murder released an episode covering Cooney's story.

References

Bibliography

 

  Mahon, Elizabeth K. (2021). “Celia Cooney: The Bobbed Haired Bandit.” In Pretty Evil: True Stories of Mobster Molls, Violent Vixens, and Murderous Matriarchs. Guilford, CT: Globe Pequot, pp. 157–174.

1904 births
1992 deaths
American robbers